The 1929 Leeds South East by-election was held on 1 August 1929.  The by-election was held due to the resignation of the incumbent Labour MP, Henry Slesser.  It was won by the Labour candidate James Milner, who defeated his only opponent, Bill Brain of the Communist Party of Great Britain, in a landslide victory.

Result

References

Leeds South East by-election
Leeds South East by-election
Leeds South East by-election
South East, 1929
1920s in Leeds